Epaphiopsis is a genus of beetles in the family Carabidae, containing the following species:

 Epaphiopsis alloligops Ueno, 1978
 Epaphiopsis alticola Ueno, 1989
 Epaphiopsis apiceplana Ueno, 1989
 Epaphiopsis brevis Ueno, 1978
 Epaphiopsis budhaica Deuve, 1988
 Epaphiopsis cavazzutii Deuve, 1995
 Epaphiopsis constricta Ueno, 1991
 Epaphiopsis dao Ueno, 2006
 Epaphiopsis davidiani Belousov, 2003
 Epaphiopsis dechangensis Belousov, 2003
 Epaphiopsis divarboris Ueno, 1989
 Epaphiopsis elegans Ueno, 1989
 Epaphiopsis elongata Ueno, 1962
 Epaphiopsis erlangensis Ueno, 1998
 Epaphiopsis formosana Jedlicka, 1946
 Epaphiopsis fujii Saenson, 1957
 Epaphiopsis fukukii Ueno, 1953
 Epaphiopsis ghirettii Deuve, 1995
 Epaphiopsis gonggaica Deuve, 1992
 Epaphiopsis gracilenta Ueno, 1995
 Epaphiopsis hayashii Ueno, 1977
 Epaphiopsis himalayica Ueno & Pawlowski, 1983
 Epaphiopsis hsuehshana Ueno, 1989
 Epaphiopsis imurai Ueno, 2006
 Epaphiopsis inconspicua Belousov, 2003
 Epaphiopsis intermedia Belousov & Kabak, 2003
 Epaphiopsis ishizuchiensis Ueno, 1962
 Epaphiopsis jacobsoni Sokolov & Shilenkov, 1987
 Epaphiopsis janoi Jeannel, 1937
 Epaphiopsis kasaharai Ueno, 1989
 Epaphiopsis korolevi Belousov, 2003
 Epaphiopsis lamellata Ueno & Yu, 1997
 Epaphiopsis laticollis Belousov, 2003
 Epaphiopsis lunanshana Belousov, 2003
 Epaphiopsis machiko Ueno, 1962
 Epaphiopsis matsudai Ueno, 1962
 Epaphiopsis morimotoi Ueno, 1984
 Epaphiopsis multipunctata Ueno, 1989
 Epaphiopsis niba Ueno, 1998
 Epaphiopsis nigra Belousov & Kabak, 2003
 Epaphiopsis nishikawai Ueno, 1987
 Epaphiopsis notos Ueno, 1991
 Epaphiopsis okadai Ueno, 1962
 Epaphiopsis oligops Ueno, 1978
 Epaphiopsis perreaui Deuve, 1988
 Epaphiopsis polita Belousov, 2003
 Epaphiopsis proxima Belousov, 2003
 Epaphiopsis punctatostriata Putzeys, 1877
 Epaphiopsis robusta Belousov, 2003
 Epaphiopsis semenovi Jeannel, 1962
 Epaphiopsis shibatai Ueno, 1989
 Epaphiopsis similata Belousov, 2003
 Epaphiopsis sinuata Belousov & Kabak, 2003
 Epaphiopsis tronquetiana Deuve, 1995
 Epaphiopsis ubaoshana Belousov, 2003
 Epaphiopsis unzenensis Jeannel, 1930
 Epaphiopsis watanabeorum Ueno, 1975
 Epaphiopsis yushana Ueno, 1989

References

Trechinae